Gábor Molnár (born 16 May 1994) is a Hungarian professional footballer who plays as a forward for Mezőkövesd.

Club statistics

References

1994 births
Sportspeople from Miskolc
Living people
Hungarian footballers
Hungary under-21 international footballers
Association football forwards
Kazincbarcikai SC footballers
Mezőkövesdi SE footballers
Puskás Akadémia FC players
Diósgyőri VTK players
Nemzeti Bajnokság I players
Nemzeti Bajnokság II players
Nemzeti Bajnokság III players